Dasydorylas horridus is a species of fly in the family Pipunculidae.

Distribution
Croatia, Hungary, Great Britain.

References

Pipunculidae
Insects described in 1897
Diptera of Europe
Taxa named by Theodor Becker